Miss America 1992 was the 65th Miss America pageant, and was held on Saturday, September 14, 1991.

Carolyn Suzanne Sapp became the first Miss Hawaii to win the crown.

Results

Placements

Order of announcements

Top 10

Top 5

Awards

Preliminary awards

Non-finalist awards

Quality of Life awards

Judges
Pierre Cossette
Paul Sorvino
Marilyn Van Derbur
Patrick Wayne
Mortimer Zuckerman
Kathleen Battle
Lee Meriwether (replaced Delta Burke, who was ill)

Candidates

References

External links
 Miss America 1992

1992
1991 in the United States
1992 beauty pageants
1991 in New Jersey
September 1991 events in the United States
Events in Atlantic City, New Jersey